Hala Finley (born May 18, 2009) is an American actress. She is best known for her roles in Man with a Plan (2016–2020) as Emme Burns and We Can Be Heroes (2020) as Ojo.

Early life
Finley was born on May 18, 2009, in Kansas City, Missouri where she was raised. She has an older brother. As a child, Finley danced and played sports. She wanted to be an actress after she watched her brother prepare for auditions.

Career
Finley began her career by appearing in print and TV commercials. At the age of four, Finley played her first role as twins in Counter Parts. In 2015, she played the lead role in Grammy. Gruesome Magazine said she was "adorable". In 2016, at the age of seven, Finley appeared in Man with a Plan as Emme Burns, the youngest of Adam Burns's (Matt LeBlanc) children. In 2018, she played Jody Altmyer in Back Roads, for which she received a positive review. Nerdy Babble said she was "most surprising part of this entire experience", saying "she blew my expectations out of the water. ... [She was] adorable and endlessly endearing." In February 2020, Finley was cast in Mandalay Pictures's Shelter.

In September 2021, Finley joined Ben Affleck and Alice Braga in action-thriller film Hypnotic reuniting with director Robert Rodriguez.

In 2022, she starred in Paradise Highway, which centers around human trafficking. Finley portrays Leila, who is trafficked in an attempt to save another character. The A.V. Club praised her performance, stating: "Finley eschews cuteness as much as possible, playing Leila almost as feral at the beginning—a writhing mass of gutteral screams and uncontrolled bodily functions, designed to be as distasteful as possible to would-be kidnappers."

Filmography

Film

Television

References

External links

Living people
2009 births
21st-century American actresses
Actresses from Kansas City, Missouri
American child actresses
American film actresses
American television actresses
American voice actresses